Atelopus ebenoides, the Huila stubfoot toad, a species of true toad, lives only in Colombia. A southern population lives in the southern Colombian Andes in the Cauca and Huila Departments. The northern population (called A. e. marinkellei) may be a separate species and occurs only in the Boyacá Department, in the Cordillera Oriental.

The species' population has probably experienced a huge decline due to chytridiomycosis. The southern species has not been recorded since 1992, although no detailed searches have been attempted. The northern population was unrecorded from 1995, despite some searching, until it was spotted again in 2006.

References

ebenoides
Amphibians of Colombia
Amphibians of the Andes
Amphibians described in 1963